Exciter may refer to:

Music
 Exciter (band), a Canadian speed metal band
 Exciter (Exciter album), also known as O.T.T., a 1988 album by Exciter
 Exciter (Depeche Mode album), a 2001 album by Depeche Mode
 "Exciter" (song) a 1978 song by Judas Priest from Stained Class
 "Excite", a 1999 song by Bomb Factory from Bomb Factory
 "Exciter", a 1983 song by Kiss from Lick It Up

Other uses
 Exciter (effect), audio effect unit
 Exciter (audio transducer), a transducer.
 Exciter bulb, a light source for reading the optical soundtrack on motion picture film
 Exciter, the oscillator and modulator together in large transmitters
 Exciter, a component in an electrical alternator that provides direct current for excitation of a permanent magnet
 S2 6.8 Exciter, an American sailboat design
 Yamaha Exciter, a motorcycle model manufactured by Yamaha Motor Corporation

See also
 Excitation (disambiguation)
 Excited (disambiguation)